The Lost Pirate Kingdom is a 2021 docuseries created for Netflix. This historical drama portrays the rise and fall of the eponymous early-18th century pirate republic based in Nassau, Bahamas. The series begins in 1715, shortly after the close of the War of the Spanish Succession, which pitted England against Spain. England had waged the war on the cheap, resorting to the use of privateers rather than incurring the expense of fully funding the Royal Navy. It was released on March 15, 2021.

Cast
James Oliver Wheatley as Edward Thatch a. k. a. Blackbeard
Sam Callis as Benjamin Hornigold
Tom Padley as Charles Vane
Kevin Howarth as Woodes Rogers
Evan Milton as Samuel Bellamy
Samuel Collings as Paulsgrave Williams
Miles Yekinni as Black Caesar
Jack Waldouck as Jack Rackham a. k. a. "Calico" Jack Rackham
Mia Tomlinson as Anne Bonny
Phill Webster as John West 
Mark Gillis as Henry Jennings
George Watkins as James Bonny
Derek Jacobi as the narrator

Episodes

Reception 
For the series, review aggregator Rotten Tomatoes reported an approval rating of 100% based on five reviews, with an average rating of 7/10.

References

External links
 
 

2021 American television series debuts
Television series about pirates